Steve Vining is an American drummer, producer and engineer. He started out as a staff producer at Pickwick Records before rising to power as the head of Windham Hill Records. As of 2006 he has acted as president of Savoy Label Group.

In 1980 he produced the Chipmunks' comeback album Chipmunk Punk for Bagdasarian Productions, and supplied the speaking voice of Simon and the singing voice of Theodore for that album, but his association with that group did not end there. He subsequently produced the Chipmunks/Nutty Squirrels collaboration album Shirley, Squirrely and Melvin the following year.

He studied with the top jingle producers and with the well-known jazz bassist Farry Gray. He then opened his own studio and record label, Film Audio Group, where he currently records Chicago area artists for films.

In the live-action/CGI films starring Alvin and the Chipmunks, he performed the singing voice for Simon.

References

External links
 

21st-century American engineers
American male musicians
American male voice actors
Living people
Place of birth missing (living people)
Year of birth missing (living people)